Coswig (Anhalt) is a former Verwaltungsgemeinschaft ("administrative community") in the district of Wittenberg, in Saxony-Anhalt, Germany. The seat of the Verwaltungsgemeinschaft was in Coswig. It was disbanded in September 2010.

The Verwaltungsgemeinschaft of Coswig (Anhalt) consisted of the following municipalities (population in 2008 in brackets):

 Coswig (12,917)
 Thießen (700)

References

Former Verwaltungsgemeinschaften in Saxony-Anhalt